This is a list of canals in Belgium.

Albert Canal
Baudouin Canal
Blankenberg Canal
Blaton-Aat Canal
Bocholt-Herentals Canal
Bossuit-Kortrijk Canal
Bourgogne Canal
Briegden-Neerharen Canal
Bruges–Ostend Canal
Bruges-Sluis Canal
Brussels Canal
Brussels-Charleroi Canal
Brussels–Scheldt Maritime Canal
Canal du Centre
Canal to Beverlo
Cantelmo Ligne
Damme Canal
De Pauw Canal
Dessel-Kwaadmechelen Canal
Dessel-Turnhout-Schoten Canal
Eeklo Canal
Engelramsgeleed
French Canal
Garingatevliet
Ghent Canal
Ghent-Bruges Canal
Ghent–Terneuzen Canal
Gouden Hand
Grootgeleed
Grote Beverdijkvaart
Haccourt-Visé Canal
Hoge Waterring
Isabella Canal
Ketelvest
Koolhofvaart
Lanaye Canal
Langeleed
Leie Canal
Lekevaart
Leopold Canal
Leuven-Dijle Canal
Liespierres Canal
Lieve
Lissewegevaart
Lo Canal
Maleleie
Moerdijkvaart
Moervaart
Mons-Condé Canal (does not exist anymore)
Monsin Canal
Nete Canal
Newport-Dunkerque Canal
Newport-Veurne Canal
Nieuwe Watergang
Nimy-Blaton-Péronnes Canal
Noord-Ede
Oude A-vaart
Ourthe Canal
Parma Canal
Plassendale-Newport Canal
Pommeroeul-Antoing Canal 
Pommeroeul-Condé Canal
Proosdijkvaart
Reep
Reigersvliet
Ring Canal (Bruges)
Ring Canal (Ghent)
Roeselare–Leie Canal
Scheldt-Rhine Canal
Schipdonk Canal
South Willem's Canal
Spermaliegeleed
Spierekanaal
Steengracht
Veurne-Dunkerque Canal
Veurne - Saint-Winoxbergen Canal
Visserijvaart
Vladslovaart
Ypres-Comines Canal
Ypres-IJzer Canal
Zuidervaart
Zwinnevaart

 
Belgium
Canals
Canals
Canals